Away is an American science fiction drama streaming television series starring Hilary Swank. Created by Andrew Hinderaker, the show premiered on Netflix on September 4, 2020. In October 2020, the series was canceled after one season. The show portrays the sacrifices an international group of astronauts must make, as they prepare to be away from their families for three years on the first crewed spaceflight to Mars.

Premise
Away follows the first crewed expedition to Mars, the Mars Joint Initiative. It features an international crew: a Chinese chemist, a world-leading British botanist with no previous experience in space, a Russian cosmonaut with the most experience in space, an Indian medical officer who is second in command, and American commander Emma Green. Emma's husband trained as an astronaut along with her, and might have commanded the mission but for a medical condition.

The three-year mission launches from the Moon; however, several crew members do not trust Emma's ability to command because of her response to a crisis situation at the very beginning of the mission.

The series is described as being "about hope, humanity and how ultimately, we need one another if we are to achieve impossible things."

Cast and characters

Main

 Hilary Swank as Emma Green, a NASA astronaut who is commander of the mission and ship Atlas. She is also the wife of Matt Logan and the mother of Lex.
 Josh Charles as Matt Logan, Emma's husband, Lex's father, and a NASA engineer who supports Emma's mission at NASA's mission control center in Houston. He was an astronaut, grounded due to having cerebral cavernous malformation (CCM).
 Vivian Wu as Lu Wang, a Chinese astronaut who is a chemist and who had an affair with CAPCOM Mei Chen. Lu is in a loveless marriage with her husband; they have a son together.
 Mark Ivanir as Misha Popov, Russian cosmonaut and the Atlas engineer. He is the world's most experienced space traveler, who sacrificed his relationship with his family to his career. He is estranged from his adult daughter because he was in space when his wife died.
 Ato Essandoh as Kwesi Weisberg-Abban, a Jewish British-Ghanaian botanist and rookie astronaut. He was born in Ghana and raised in England by adoptive parents, after his birth parents died. 
 Ray Panthaki as Group Captain Ram Arya, the mission's Indian second-in-command pilot and a medical officer. He is estranged from his family.
 Talitha Bateman as Alexis "Lex" Logan, Emma and Matt's teenage daughter.

Recurring

 Monique Gabriela Curnen as Melissa Ramirez, Emma's crew support and friend who is helping out Emma's family.
 Michael Patrick Thornton as Dr. Putney, Emma's NASA psychologist.
 Martin Cummins as Jack Willmore, a NASA astronaut who was a potential candidate to command the mission, and serves as CAPCOM.
 Gabrielle Rose as Darlene Cole, head of NASA Flight Command.
 Brian Markinson as George Lane, another NASA leader.
 Fiona Fu as CNSA Mission Liaison, Li Jun.
 Nadia Hatta as Mei Chen, a CNSA mission control, Lu's love interest
 Alessandro Juliani as Dr. Lawrence Madigan, Matt's rehab doctor.
 Felicia Patti as Cassie, Melissa's teenage daughter.
 Veena Sood as ISRO Mission Liaison, Meera Patel.
 Anthony F. Ingram as ESA Mission Liaison, Ted Salter.
 Adam Irigoyen as Isaac Rodriguez, a boy Lex meets when she returns to school and later develops feelings for.
 Diana Bang as Freddie.
 John Murphy as Ryan Masters.
 Derrick Su as Zhang Lei.
 Olena Medwid as Natalya Popov, Misha's estranged daughter.

Production

Development
On June 10, 2018, it was announced that Netflix had given the production a series order for a first season consisting of ten episodes. The series was created by Andrew Hinderaker, inspired by an Esquire article of the same name by Chris Jones. Executive producers are expected to consist of Jason Katims, Matt Reeves, and Adam Kassan. Hinderaker was set to serve as a co-executive producer and Rafi Crohn as a co-producer. Production companies involved with the series are to include True Jack Productions, 6th & Idaho and Universal Television. Michelle Lee, former head of development at True Jack Productions, who was involved with the project's development and sale to Netflix, was expected to be credited as an executive producer on the first episode of the series. Lee left True Jack Productions in December 2017. Jeni Mulein, who joined the production company as the new head of development in April 2018, was set to be credited as co-executive producer on the second through tenth episodes. On October 19, 2018, it was reported that Edward Zwick had joined the production as an executive producer and that he would direct the first episode of the series.

Scientific consultation
As with any science fiction production, Away blends real science with futuristic possibilities. A notable example is a plot point in Vital Signs in which the astronauts listen intently for a sound boom picked up by a real-life Mars rover called InSight. In 2022 scientists used InSight to listen for the landing of a real spacecraft.

Casting
On May 8, 2019, Hilary Swank was cast in a lead role. On July 17, 2019, Josh Charles joined the cast in a starring role. On August 8, 2019, it was announced Talitha Bateman, Ato Essandoh, Mark Ivanir, Ray Panthaki and Vivian Wu would play lead roles in the series.

Filming
Principal photography for the first season began on August 26, 2019, and concluded on February 5, 2020, in North Vancouver, Canada.

Episodes

{{Episode table |background=#57547B |overall=|title= |director= |writer= |airdate= |released=y |episodes=

{{Episode list
 |EpisodeNumber = 6
 |Title = A Little Faith 
 |DirectedBy = David Boyd
 |WrittenBy = Janine Nabers
 |OriginalAirDate = 
 |ShortSummary = The Atlas''' primary water reclamation system breaks down and the backup system is insufficient for the remainder of the trip. Misha suggests a risky plan to replace the primary filter with the backup, but is unable to carry it out because he cheated on his eye exam and his eyesight has continued to deteriorate. The crew reassemble the backup system, but it only produces water at 50% rate, necessitating rationing, and the death of Kwesi's plants. Through flashback, young Kwesi is shown growing up with adoptive parents in England and learning about the Jewish faith. Matt meets Isaac, and warns Alexis to not to join Isaac in riding dirt bikes.
 |LineColor = 57547B
}}

{{Episode list
 |EpisodeNumber = 8
 |Title = Vital Signs
 |DirectedBy      = Charlotte Brändström
 |WrittenBy       = Chris Jones
 |OriginalAirDate = 
 |ShortSummary    = Mission Control lose contact with Atlas' supply ship Pegasus, which has a highly critical water reclamation system necessary for the crew's survival. Assuming Pegasus has been lost, NASA advise a slingshot maneuver to bring the crew home. Lu considers returning without landing as a failure, and suggests using data from the InSight probe on the Martian surface to check if there was a sonic boom from Pegasus entering the atmosphere successfully. The sonic boom is detected, and Lu convinces Emma to not give up hope that the Pegasus landed safely. Meanwhile, Alexis deals with the stress of the events, including when Isaac blames himself for her motorbike accident and suggesting for them to take a break, really upsetting her, so she breaks things off with him. Later, she finally decides to get tested for the CCM gene that caused Matt's stroke.
 |LineColor = 57547B
}}

}}

Release
On July 7, 2020, Netflix released the first teaser trailer for the series, which was followed by the official trailer on August 10, 2020. Season one premiered on September 4, 2020. On October 19, 2020, Netflix canceled the series after one season.

Reception
For the series, review aggregator Rotten Tomatoes reported an approval rating of 59% based on 66 reviews, with an average rating of 6.22/10. The website's critics consensus reads, "Away doesn't reach the stratosphere as a spacetime adventure, but emotional earnestness and a strong cast help make this a compelling enough journey to the stars." Metacritic gave the series a weighted average score of 59 out of 100 based on 27 reviews, indicating "mixed or average reviews".

Kristen Baldwin of Entertainment Weekly gave the series a C and described the series as "a self-important patchwork of space clichés and boilerplate family conflict that never manages to make it into orbit." Reviewing the series for Rolling Stone'', Alan Sepinwall gave a rating of 3/5 and said, "The space scenes, while familiar, are energetic, fun, and often moving, while the Earthbound drama feels like we're being abruptly yanked back into normal gravity after getting to enjoy the wonders of floating among the stars."

See also
 Mars (2016 TV series)
The First (2018 TV series)

References

External links
 
 

2020 American television series debuts
2020 American television series endings
2020s American drama television series
2020s American science fiction television series
English-language Netflix original programming
Mars in television
Serial drama television series
Space adventure television series
Television series about space programs
Television series by Universal Television
Television shows set in Houston